The 1978 Milwaukee Brewers season involved the Brewers finishing third in the American League East with a record of 93 wins and 69 losses. It was the Brewers first winning season in franchise history since moving to Milwaukee from Seattle in 1970.

Offseason 
 October 25, 1977: Gorman Thomas was sent by the Brewers to the Texas Rangers to complete an earlier deal (the Rangers traded Ed Kirkpatrick to the Brewers for a player to be named later) made on August 20.
 December 6, 1977: Kevin Kobel was purchased from the Brewers by the New York Mets.
 December 14, 1977: Ken McMullen was released by the Brewers.
 December 31, 1977: Ray Fosse was signed as a free agent by the Brewers.
 January 16, 1978: Randy Stein was signed as a free agent by the Brewers.
 February 8, 1978: Gorman Thomas was purchased by the Brewers from the Rangers.
 March 30, 1978: Von Joshua was released by the Brewers.

Regular season

Opening Day starters 
Jerry Augustine
Sal Bando
Cecil Cooper
Andy Etchebarren
Larry Hisle
Sixto Lezcano
Paul Molitor
Don Money
Lenn Sakata
Gorman Thomas

Season standings

Record vs. opponents

Notable transactions 
 April 1, 1978: Bob Galasso was signed as a free agent by the Brewers.
 April 4, 1978: Tony Muser was signed as a free agent by the Brewers.
 June 6, 1978: Rickey Keeton was drafted by the Brewers in the 3rd round of the 1978 Major League Baseball Draft.
 August 3, 1978: Jamie Quirk was traded by the Brewers to the Kansas City Royals for Gerry Ako (minors) and cash.

Roster

Player stats

Batting

Starters by position 
Note: Pos = Position; G = Games played; AB = At bats; H = Hits; Avg. = Batting average; HR = Home runs; RBI = Runs batted in

Other batters 
Note: G = Games played; AB = At bats; H = Hits; Avg. = Batting average; HR = Home runs; RBI = Runs batted in

Pitching

Starting pitchers 
Note: G = Games pitched; IP = Innings pitched; W = Wins; L = Losses; ERA = Earned run average; SO = Strikeouts

Other pitchers 
Note: G = Games pitched; IP = Innings pitched; W = Wins; L = Losses; ERA = Earned run average; SO = Strikeouts

Relief pitchers 
Note: G = Games pitched; W = Wins; L = Losses; SV = Saves; ERA = Earned run average; SO = Strikeouts

Farm system

The Brewers' farm system consisted of four minor league affiliates in 1978.

Notes

References 
1978 Milwaukee Brewers team page at Baseball Reference
1978 Milwaukee Brewers team page at www.baseball-almanac.com

Milwaukee Brewers seasons
Milwaukee Brewers season
Mil